Anatomy of a Typeface is a 1990 book on typefaces written by Alexander Lawson.

Background
The book is notable for devoting entire chapters to the development and uses of individual or small groupings of typefaces. Beyond Anatomy of a Typeface Lawson has considered and discussed the classification of types. Within Anatomy, Lawson arranges the typefaces by classification. In his preface, Lawson qualifies his classification: "After using this system in the teaching of typography over a thirty-year period, I know that it is reasonably effective in the initial study of printing types. I am not disposed to consider it faultless by any means. A classification system, after all, is simply a tool ... Its primary purpose is to help people become familiar with these forms preparatory to putting them to effective and constructive typographic use."

Following are the thirty-one chapters of Anatomy of a Typeface: 

 the Black-letter Types: Goudy Text and Hammer Uncial;

 Old Style Types: Cloister Old Style, Centaur, Bembo, Arrighi, Dante, Goudy Old Style, Palatino, Garamond, Galliard, Granjon, Sabon, Janson, Caslon, Baskerville, Bodoni, Bulmer, Bell, Oxford, Caledonia, Cheltenham, and Bookman;

 Newspaper Types: Times Roman; 

 Twentieth-century Gothics: Franklin Gothic;

 Square-serif Revival: Clarendon;

 Humanist Sans-serif Types: Optima; 
 Geometric Sans-serif Types: Futura;

 Script, Cursive, and Decorated Types; Type Making from Punch to Computer.

Editions
The third printing of Anatomy appeared in 2002.

See also
 The Elements of Typographic Style

References

Design books
1990 non-fiction books
Godine books